The following outline is provided as an overview of and topical guide to knowledge:

Knowledge – familiarity with someone or something, which can include facts, information, descriptions,  and/or skills acquired through experience or education. It can refer to the theoretical or practical understanding of a subject. It can be implicit (as with practical skill or expertise) or explicit (as with the theoretical understanding of a subject); and it can be more or less formal or systematic.

Types of knowledge

By form 
 A priori and a posteriori knowledge – these terms are used with respect to reasoning (epistemology) to distinguish necessary conclusions from first premises... 
A priori knowledge or justification – knowledge that is independent of experience, as with mathematics (3+2=5), tautologies ("All bachelors are unmarried"), and deduction from pure reason (e.g., ontological proofs).  
A posteriori knowledge or justification – knowledge dependent on experience or empirical evidence, as with most aspects of science and personal knowledge.
 Descriptive knowledge – also called declarative knowledge or propositional knowledge, it is the type of knowledge that is, by its very nature, expressed in declarative sentences or indicative propositions (e.g., "Albert is fat", or "It is raining"). This is distinguished from what is commonly known as "know-how" or procedural knowledge (the knowledge of how, and especially how best, to perform some task), and "knowing of", or knowledge by acquaintance (the knowledge of something's existence).  
 Experience – knowledge or mastery of an event or subject gained through involvement in or exposure to it.
 Empirical evidence – also referred to as empirical data, empirical knowledge, and sense experience, it is a collective term for the knowledge or source of knowledge acquired by means of the senses, particularly by observation and experimentation. After Immanuel Kant, it is common in philosophy to call the knowledge thus gained a posteriori knowledge. This is contrasted with a priori knowledge, the knowledge accessible from pure reason alone.
 Experiential knowledge –
 Explicit knowledge – knowledge that can be readily articulated, codified, accessed and verbalized. It can be easily transmitted to others. Most forms of explicit knowledge can be stored in certain media. The information contained in encyclopedias and textbooks are good examples of explicit knowledge.
 Extelligence – term coined by Ian Stewart and Jack Cohen in their 1997 book Figments of Reality. They define it as the cultural capital that is available to us in the form of external media (e.g., tribal legends, folklore, nursery rhymes, books, videotapes, CD-ROMs, etc.).
 Knowledge by acquaintance – according to Bertrand Russell, knowledge by acquaintance is obtained through a direct causal (experience-based) interaction between a person and the object that person is perceiving. Sense-data from that object are the only things that people can ever become acquainted with; they can never truly KNOW the physical object itself. The distinction between "knowledge by acquaintance" and "knowledge by description" was promoted by Russell (notably in his 1905 paper On Denoting). Russell was extremely critical of the equivocal nature of the word "know", and believed that the equivocation arose from a failure to distinguish between the two fundamentally different types of knowledge.
 Libre knowledge – knowledge released in such a way that users are free to read, listen to, watch, or otherwise experience it; to learn from or with it; to copy, adapt and use it for any purpose; and to share the work (unchanged or modified). Whilst shared tacit knowledge is regarded as implicitly libre, (explicit) libre knowledge is defined as a generalisation of the libre software definition.
 Procedural knowledge – also known as imperative knowledge, it is the knowledge exercised in the performance of some task. Commonly referred to as "knowing-how" and opposed to "knowing-that" (descriptive knowledge).
 Tacit knowledge –  kind of knowledge that is difficult to transfer to another person by means of writing it down or verbalizing it. For example, that London is in the United Kingdom is a piece of explicit knowledge that can be written down, transmitted, and understood by a recipient. However, the ability to speak a language, knead dough, play a musical instrument or design and use complex equipment requires all sorts of knowledge that is not always known explicitly, even by expert practitioners, and which is difficult or impossible to explicitly transfer to other users.

By scope 

 Common knowledge – knowledge that is known by everyone or nearly everyone, usually with reference to the community in which the term is used.
 Customer knowledge – knowledge for, about, or from customers.
 Domain knowledge – valid knowledge used to refer to an area of human endeavour, an autonomous computer activity, or other specialized discipline.
 Foundational knowledge – the knowledge necessary for understanding or usefully applying further knowledge in a field.
 General knowledge –  information that has been accumulated over time through various mediums. This definition excludes highly specialized learning that can only be obtained with extensive training and information confined to a single medium. General knowledge is an important component of crystallized intelligence and is strongly associated with general intelligence, and with openness to experience.
 Metaknowledge – knowledge about knowledge. Bibliographies are a form of metaknowledge. Patterns within scientific literature is another.
 
 Self-knowledge – information that an individual draws upon when finding an answer to the question "What am I like?".
 Traditional knowledge – knowledge systems embedded in the cultural traditions of regional, indigenous, or local communities. Traditional knowledge includes types of knowledge about traditional technologies of subsistence (e.g. tools and techniques for hunting or agriculture), midwifery, ethnobotany and ecological knowledge, traditional medicine, celestial navigation, ethnoastronomy, the climate, and others. These kinds of knowledge, crucial for subsistence and survival, are generally based on accumulations of empirical observation and on interaction with the environment.
 Traditional ecological knowledge –

Structure of knowledge 

Taxonomies –
 Types of subject taxonomies
 Document classification –
 Library classification –
 Taxonomy for search engines –
 Specific taxonomies of knowledge
 Figurative System of Human Knowledge –
 Propædia – first of three parts of the 15th edition of Encyclopædia Britannica, presenting its Outline of Knowledge.
 Tree of Knowledge System –

Types of bodies of recorded knowledge 

 Academic disciplines – branch of knowledge that is taught and researched as part of higher education. A scholar's discipline is commonly defined and recognized by the university faculties and learned societies to which he or she belongs and the academic journals in which he or she publishes research. However, no formal criteria exist for defining an academic discipline.
 Body of knowledge (BOK) – specialized term in knowledge representation meaning the set of concepts, terms and activities that make up a professional domain, as defined by the relevant learned society or professional association.
 Curriculi – plural of curriculum, which means the totality of student experiments that occur in the educational process.  The term often refers specifically to a planned sequence of instruction, or to a view of planned student's experiences in terms of the educator's or school's instructional goals. Curricula may be tightly standardized, or may include a high level of instructor or learner autonomy.  Many countries have national curricula in primary and secondary education, such as the United Kingdom's National Curriculum.
 Encyclopedias – type of reference work or compendium holding a comprehensive summary of information from either all branches of knowledge or a particular branch of knowledge. Encyclopedias are divided into articles or entries, which are usually accessed alphabetically by article name. Encyclopedia entries are longer and more detailed than those in most dictionaries. Generally speaking, unlike dictionary entries, which focus on linguistic information about words, encyclopedia articles focus on factual information concerning the subject for which the article is named. 
 Knowledge base –
 Personal knowledge base –
 Knowledge commons –
 Libraries – a library is a collection of sources of information and similar resources, made accessible to a defined community for reference or borrowing. It provides physical or digital access to material, and may be a physical building or room, or a virtual space, or both. A library's collection can include books, periodicals, newspapers, manuscripts, films, maps, prints, documents, microform, CDs, cassettes, videotapes, DVDs, Blu-ray Discs, e-books, audiobooks, databases, and other formats. Libraries range in size from a few shelves of books to several million items.

Specific bodies of recorded knowledge, by type 

 Specific BOKs (bodies of knowledge, in the context of the knowledge representation field)
 A Guide to the Business Analysis Body of Knowledge
 Canadian IT Body of Knowledge
 Civil Engineering Body of Knowledge
 Common Body of Knowledge
 Enterprise Architecture Body of Knowledge
 Geographic Information Science and Technology Body of Knowledge
 Project Management Body of Knowledge
 Software Engineering Body of Knowledge
 Data Management Body of Knowledge
 Specific encyclopedias
 Bibliography of encyclopedias
 List of encyclopedias by branch of knowledge
 List of encyclopedias by language
 List of historical encyclopedias
 List of online encyclopedias
 Wikipedia – largest encyclopedia in the world. It is a free, web-based, collaborative, multilingual encyclopedia project supported by the non-profit Wikimedia Foundation. Its more than 20 million articles (over 5.04 million in English) have been written collaboratively by volunteers around the world. Almost all of its articles can be edited by anyone with access to the site, and it has about 100,000 regularly active contributors. 
 Specific knowledge bases
 Knowledge Vault – knowledge base created by Google. As of 2014, it contained 1.6 billion facts which had been collated automatically from the Internet.

Epistemology (philosophy of knowledge) 

Epistemology – philosophy of knowledge. It is the study of knowledge and justified belief. It questions what knowledge is and how it can be acquired, and the extent to which knowledge pertinent to any given subject or entity can be acquired. Much of the debate in this field has focused on the philosophical analysis of the nature of knowledge and how it relates to connected notions such as truth, belief, and justification.
 DIKW pyramid – theoretical model of the relationship between data, information, knowledge, and wisdom
 Knowledge neglect – failure to apply knowledge
 Theory of knowledge (IB course) – a course related to epistemology

Management of knowledge 

Knowledge management – 
 Chief knowledge officer –
 Knowledge balance sheet –
 Knowledge ecosystem –
 Knowledge mobilization –
 Knowledge organization (effort) – 
 Knowledge organization system – 
 Knowledge organization (company or agency) –
 Knowledge transfer – 
 Knowledge worker –

Obtaining knowledge 

Methods of obtaining knowledge –
 Exploration – 
 Space exploration – 
 Revelation – 
 Research – 
 Scientific method – 
 Experimentation – 
 Learning – 
 Autodidactism – self-education; act of self-directed learning about a subject or subjects in which one has had little to no formal education.
 Reading – 
 Studying – 
 Knowledge building – 
 Knowledge building communities –

Knowledge storage 
Knowledge can be stored in:

 Books – 
 Knowledge bases – 
 Ontology – formal naming and definition of the types, properties, and interrelationships of the entities that really or fundamentally exist for a particular domain of discourse.
 Commonsense knowledge base – database containing all the general knowledge that most people possess, represented in a way that it is available to artificial intelligence programs that use natural language or make inferences about the ordinary world.
 Knowledge graph – another name for ontology
 Knowledge representation (AI) – 
 Body of knowledge (BOK) – complete set of concepts, terms and activities that make up a professional domain, as defined by the relevant learned society or professional association
 Libraries – 
 Memory –

Knowledge retrieval 

Knowledge retrieval – Stored knowledge can be retrieved by:
 Knowledge engine
 Wolfram Alpha – computational knowledge engine or answer engine developed by Wolfram Research
 Knowledge Engine (Wikimedia Foundation) – search engine project by the Wikimedia Foundation
 Google Search – powered by:
 Google Knowledge Graph – knowledge base used by Google to enhance its search engine's search results with semantic search information gathered from a wide variety of sources
 Knowledge discovery – 
 Reading –

Imparting  knowledge 
Imparting knowledge means spreading or disseminating knowledge to others.
 Communication – purposeful activity of information exchange between two or more participants in order to convey or receive the intended meanings through a shared system of signs and semiotic rules. The basic steps of communication are the forming of communicative intent, message composition, message encoding, transmission of signal, reception of signal, message decoding and interpretation of the message by the recipient. Examples of methods of communication used to impart knowledge include: Writing and Publishing.
 Education – process of facilitating learning.
 Educational methods:
 Storytelling – 
 Discussion – 
 Teaching – 
 Training – 
 Directed research – 
 Knowledge sharing – activity through which knowledge (namely, information, skills, or expertise) is exchanged among people, friends, families, communities (for example, Wikipedia), or organizations.
 Knowledge café –
 Knowledge transfer – 
 Knowledge translation –

History of the knowledge of humanity 

 Historiography (History of history) –
 History of exploration – 
 History of space exploration – 
 History of invention – 
 History of libraries – 
 History of philosophy – 
 History of science – 
 Knowledge deities –
 Taxes on knowledge –

Knowledge and society

Economics of knowledge 

 Intellectual capital –
 Knowledge broker –
 Knowledge Economic Index –
 Knowledge economy – 
 Knowledge gap hypothesis – 
 Knowledge market –
 Knowledge services –
 Knowledge spillover –
 Knowledge value –
 Monopolies of knowledge –

Politics of knowledge 

 Access to Knowledge movement – 
 Knowledge assessment methodology –
 Knowledge society – 
 Local knowledge problem –
 Open access –
 Berlin Declaration on Open Access to Knowledge in the Sciences and Humanities –
 Scientia potentia est – Latin for "knowledge is power".
 The Cost of Knowledge protest –
 World Brain –

Sociology of knowledge 

Sociology of knowledge –
 Knowledge community –
 Knowledge space –

Knowledge technology 

 Knowledge-based systems –
 Knowledge acquisition –
 Knowledge base – 
 Knowledge engineering –
 Knowledge engineer –
 Knowledge extraction – 
 Knowledge level – 
 Knowledge level modeling – 
 Knowledge modeling –
 Knowledge management (see above) –

Knowledge of humanity 

The world's knowledge (knowledge possessed by human civilization)
  Humanities and arts 
 Classics
 History
 Literature
 Performing arts
 Dance
 Music
 Theatre
 Philosophy
 Religion
 Visual arts
 Media type
 Painting
 Social sciences
 Anthropology
 Economics
 Trade
 Education
 Geography
 Law
 Jurisprudence
 Linguistics / Language
 Political science
 Psychology
 Sociology
 Science
 Natural Sciences
 Astronomy
 Biology
 Chemistry
 Earth Sciences
 Mathematics
 Physics
 Engineering / Technology
 Aerospace engineering
 Biotechnology / Biological engineering
 Biomedical engineering
 Chemical engineering
 Civil engineering
 Computer science / Computer engineering
 Electrical engineering
 Electronics engineering
 Environmental engineering
 Industrial engineering
 Marine engineering / Naval architecture
 Materials science and engineering
 Mechanical engineering
 Nuclear science and engineering
 Healthcare sciences
 Dentistry and oral health
 Medicine and surgery
 Veterinary medicine / Veterinary surgery

Organizations 

 Institute of Knowledge Transfer –
 International Society for Knowledge Organization –
 Open Knowledge International –

Publications

Books 
 A Guide for the Perplexed – critique of materialist scientism and an exploration of the nature and organization of knowledge. By E. F. Schumacher.
 Knowledge and Its Limits –

Journals 
 Electronic Journal of Knowledge Management –
 Journal of Information & Knowledge Management –
 Journal of Information Science –
 Journal of Knowledge Management –
 Journal of Knowledge Management Practice –
 Journal of Web Semantics –
 Knowledge Management Research & Practice –

See also 

 Belief
 Data
 Information
 Truth
 Wisdom
 Knowledge representation and reasoning
 Knowledge building
 Knowledge enterprise
 Empirical knowledge
 Simple Knowledge Organization System
 Encyclopedic knowledge
 Knowledge intensive business services
 Knowledge entrepreneurship
 Institutional memory
 Omniscience
 Knowledge environment
 Personal knowledge management
 Knowledge management software
 Tribal knowledge
 Democratization of knowledge
 Open Knowledge Base Connectivity
 Knowledge integration
 Knowledge triangle
 Curse of knowledge
 Knowledge value chain
 Economics of scientific knowledge
 Specialization of knowledge
 Knowledge ark
 Knowledge building communities
 Knowledge-based theory of the firm
 Half-life of knowledge
 Forbidden knowledge
 Encapsulated knowledge
 Threshold knowledge
 History of knowledge
 Social knowledge management
 List of knowledge management concepts
 Knowledge compilation

References

External links 

 Diagrams of knowledge from throughout society and history

Knowledge
Knowledge